RawTherapee is application software for processing photographs in raw image formats, as created by many digital cameras. It comprises a subset of image editing operations specifically aimed at non-destructive post-production of raw photos and is primarily focused on improving a photographer's workflow by facilitating the handling of large numbers of images. It is notable for the advanced control it gives the user over the demosaicing and developing process. It is cross-platform, with versions for Microsoft Windows, macOS and Linux.

RawTherapee was originally written by Gábor Horváth of Budapest, Hungary, and was re-licensed as free and open-source software under the GNU General Public License Version 3 in January 2010. It is written in C++, using a GTK+ front-end and a patched version of dcraw for reading raw files. The name "Therapee" was originally an acronym derived from "The Experimental Raw Photo Editor".

Features 
RawTherapee involves the concept of non-destructive editing, similar to that of some other raw conversion software. Adjustments made by the user are immediately reflected in the preview image, though they are not physically applied to the opened image but the parameters are saved to a separate sidecar file. These adjustments are then applied during the export process.

All the internal processing is done in a high precision 32-bit floating point engine.

Input file formats 
RawTherapee supports most raw formats, including Pentax Pixel Shift, Canon Dual-Pixel, and those from Foveon and X-Trans sensors. It also supports common non-raw image formats like JPEG, PNG and TIFF as well as high dynamic range, 16/24/32-bit raw DNG images.

RawTherapee uses a patched version of dcraw code to read and parse raw formats, with additional tweaks and constraints to parameters such as white levels and the raw crop area based on in-house measurements. Thus, RawTherapee supports all the formats supported by dcraw.

User interface 
RawTherapee provides the user with a file browser, a queue, a panel for batch image adjustments, a 1:1 preview of the embedded JPEG image in the case of raw files, and an image editing tab.

The file browser shows photo thumbnails along with a caption of the shooting information metadata. The browser includes 5-star rating, flagging, and an Exif-based filter. It can be used to apply a profile, or parts of a profile, to a whole selection of photos in one operation.

A toolbox alongside the file browser allows for batch image adjustments.

The queue tab allows one to put exporting photos on hold until done adjusting them in the Editor, so that the CPU is fully available to the user while tweaking a photo, instead of processing photos while the user is trying to tweak new ones which could result in a sluggish interface. Alternatively, it can be used to process photos alongside tweaking new ones if one has a CPU capable of handling the workload.

The Editor tab is where the user tweaks photos. While the image is opened for editing, the user is provided with a preview window with pan and zoom capabilities. A color histogram is also present offering linear and logarithmic scales and separate R, G, B and L channels. All adjustments are reflected in the history queue and the user can revert any of the changes at any time. There is also the possibility of taking multiple snapshots of the history queue allowing for various versions of the image being shown. These snapshots are not written to the sidecar file and are subsequently lost once the photo has been closed, however work is underway on migrating the PP3 sidecar system to XMP which already supports storing snapshots.

Adjustment tools and processing 

 Bayer demosaicing algorithms: AMaZE, IGV, LMMSE, EAHD, HPHD, VNG4, DCB, AHD, fast or mono, as well as none.
 Raw files from X-Trans sensors have the 3-pass, 1-pass and fast demosaicing methods at their disposal.
 Processing profiles support via sidecar files with the ability to fully and partially load, save and copy profiles between images
 Processing parameters can be generated dynamically based on image metadata using the Dynamic Profile Builder.
 Exposure control and curves in the L*a*b* and RGB color spaces
 CIECAM02 mode
 Advanced highlight reconstruction algorithms and shadow/highlight controls
 Tone mapping using edge-preserving decomposition
 Pre-crop vignetting correction and post-crop vignetting for artistic effect
 Graduated filter
 Various methods of sharpening
 Various methods of noise reduction
 Detail recovery
 Removal of purple fringing
 Manual and automatic pre- and post-demosaic chromatic aberration correction
 Advanced wavelet processing
 Retinex processing
 White balance (presets, color temperature, spot white balance and auto white balance)
 Channel mixer
 Black-and-white conversion
 Color boost and vibrance (saturation control with the option of preserving natural skin tones)
 Hue, saturation and value adjustments using curves
 Various methods of color toning
 Lockable color picker
 Wide gamut preview support on Microsoft Windows and Linux (the macOS preview is limited to sRGB)
 Soft-proofing support
 Color-managed workflow
 ICC color profiles (input, working and output)
 DCP color profiles (input)
 Adobe Lens Correction Profiles (LCP)
 Cropping, resizing, post-resize sharpening
 Rotation with visual straightening tool
 Distortion correction
 Perspective adjustment
 Dark frame subtraction
 Flat field removal (hue shifts, dust removal, vignetting correction)
 Hot and dead pixel filters
 Metadata (Exif and IPTC) editor
 A processing queue to free up the CPU during editing where instant feedback is important and to make maximal use of it afterwards

Output formats 
The output format can be selected from:
 TIFF (8-bit, 16-bit, 16-bit float, 32-bit float)
 JPEG (8-bit)
 PNG (8-bit and 16-bit)

See also
 Darktable
 Rawstudio
 UFRaw

References

External links 

 

Digital photography
Formerly proprietary software
Free graphics software
Free photo software
Free software programmed in C++
Graphics software that uses GTK
Photo software for Linux
Raw image processing software